Talasani Srinivas Yadav (born 6 October 1965) is an Indian politician who is the current Minister for Animal Husbandry, Fisheries and Cinematography of Telangana since 2019. He is an MLA from Sanathnagar Assembly constituency. Previously he represented from Secunderabad Assembly Constituency.

Early life
Talasani Srinivas Yadav was born on 6 October 1965, in Hyderabad, Telangana to Venkatesham Yadav and Lalitha Bai. Talasani completed his intermediate education. He is married to Suvarna and the couple has one son and two daughters.

Political life
Talasani entered into politics by contesting as Monda Market corporator in 1986 as Janata party candidate, but lost. Srinivas Yadav joined Telugu Desam Party and contested from Secunderabad Assembly constituency in 1994 and won as MLA. In 1999 assembly elections, Talasani defeated Mary Ravindranath of Congress Party and became Minister for labour, tourism in the Andhra Pradesh Government in Nara Chandrababu Naidu's Cabinet. In 2004 Assembly elections he was defeated by T. Padma Rao Goud who has contested from Telangana Rastra Samithi. Srinivas Yadav again contested in 2008 Assembly by elections defeating his nearest Congress Party candidate Pitla Krishna by 18,067 votes and in 2009 Andhra Pradesh assembly elections he contested from same constituency and lost to Cine Actress and Congress candidate Jayasudha by nearly 5000 votes. In 2005 he became State Telugu Yuvata President.

After formation of Telangana State Srinivas Yadav contested in 2014 Assembly Elections from Sanath Nagar Constituency from Telugu Desam Party and won. Later on he joined Telangana Rashtra Samithi Party in presence of Chief Minister Kalvakuntla Chandra Shekar Rao and taken Charge as Commercial Taxes Minister. In 2018 he contested from Sanath Nagar Constituency from TRS party and was elected as MLA and taken oath as State cabinet minister on 19 February 2019.

See also 
List of constituencies of Telangana Legislative Assembly
Secunderabad (Assembly constituency)

References 

 Secunderabad Assembly constituency in 1994

1965 births
Living people
Politicians from Hyderabad, India
State cabinet ministers of Telangana
Telangana MLAs 2014–2018
Telangana politicians
Telangana Rashtra Samithi politicians
Telangana MLAs 2018–2023